Chrysobothris tranquebarica, known generally as the Australian pine borer or mangrove borer, is a species of metallic wood-boring beetle in the family Buprestidae. It is found in the Caribbean Sea and North America.

References

Further reading

 
 
 

Buprestidae
Articles created by Qbugbot
Beetles described in 1788
Taxa named by Johann Friedrich Gmelin